This article documents expected notable spaceflight events during the year 2024.

NASA plans to launch the Artemis 2 mission on the Space Launch System, sending astronauts around the moon on a ten day lunar flyby.

NASA plans to launch the first two components of the Lunar Gateway, a key part of its efforts to return to the Moon and a stepping stone for crewed missions to Mars in the 2030s.

NASA also plans to launch the Europa Clipper, which will study the Jovian moon Europa while in orbit around Jupiter.

ESA plans to conduct an orbital test flight of the Space Rider uncrewed spaceplane towards the end of the year.

Japan plans to launch the Martian Moons Exploration (MMX) spacecraft to collect and bring back samples from one of the moons of Mars, Phobos.

The first Indian crewed spaceflight, Gaganyaan 3, is planned for late 2024.

Orbital launches 

|colspan=8 style="background:white;"|

January 
|-

|colspan=8 style="background:white;"|

February 
|-

|colspan=8 style="background:white;"|

March 
|-

|colspan=8 style="background:white;"|

April 
|-

|colspan=8 style="background:white;"|

May 
|-

|colspan=8 style="background:white;"|

June 
|-

|colspan=8 style="background:white;"|

July 
|-

|colspan=8 style="background:white;"|

August 
|-

|colspan=8 style="background:white;"|

September 
|-

|colspan=8 style="background:white;"|

October 
|-

|colspan=8 style="background:white;"|

November 
|-

|colspan=8 style="background:white;"|

December 
|-

|colspan=8 style="background:white;"|

To be determined 
|-

|}

Suborbital flights 

|}

Deep-space rendezvous

Extravehicular activities (EVAs)

Orbital launch statistics

By country 
For the purposes of this section, the yearly tally of orbital launches by country assigns each flight to the country of origin of the rocket, not to the launch services provider or the spaceport. For example, Soyuz launches by Arianespace in Kourou are counted under Russia because Soyuz-2 is a Russian rocket.

By rocket

By family

By type

By configuration

By spaceport

By orbit

Expected Maiden Flights
 Aurora – Reaction Dynamics – Canada
 Eris Block 2 – Gilmour Space Technologies – Australia
 Gravity-2 – Orienspace – China 
 Hanbit-Nano – Innospace – South Korea 
 Laguna – Phantom Space – USA 
 Nebula-1 – Deep Blue Aerospace – China 
 Neutron – Rocket Lab – USA 
 Pallas-1 – Galactic Energy – China
 Zephyr – Venture Orbit – France 
 Volans – Equatorial Space Systems – Singapore

Notes

References

External links

 
Spaceflight by year